Karibasavaiah (1959 – 3 February 2012) was an Indian actor who appeared in Kannada cinema and a theatre personality. He has acted in over 120 films. He died on 3 February 2012 after a road traffic accident in Bangalore. He made his debut in the movie Undo Hodha, Kondu Hodha. Some of his memorable films are Kotreshi Kanasu, Janumada Jodi, Galate Aliyandru, Mungarina Minchu, Yaarige Salute Sambala, Police Story 2 and Ullasa Utsaha.

Background
He was born in 1959 and belonged to a poor Kuruba Gowda family. As a child, he learnt Kuruba Gowda art forms like Kamsale, Dollu Kunitha and Harikathe. He worked as a lab assistant in a Seshadripuram college before entering film industry. He started acting in television serials beginning with Doddamane. Director Nagathihalli Chandrasekhar gave him the break in Kannada film industry. Nagathihalli Chandrasekhar also helped him during his last days by paying the medical bills via his association Abhivyakthi Samskrithika Vedike. Karibasavaiah was in distress since 2009 when his married daughter Radha committed suicide. A stage actor, television and cinema actor Karibasavaiah is known for natural performance. He was paired with another popular actress Umashree in several movies and was considered a hit pair. Belakinedege was his last released film.

Death
Karibasavaiah was admitted to a private hospital in Bangalore on 31 January 2012 following a road accident. He was returning home after completing the shooting for the film Breaking News. He succumbed to the injuries and died on 3 February. The last rites were performed in his native place, Kodigehalli village, Thyamagondlu Hobli.

Partial filmography

References

External links
 
  on TV9 Kannada

1959 births
2012 deaths
Male actors in Kannada cinema
Indian male film actors
20th-century Indian male actors
21st-century Indian male actors
Male actors from Mysore